Ben Heenan (born February 5, 1990) is a Canadian born former American football guard who played for the Indianapolis Colts of the National Football League (NFL) in 2015. He also played with the Saskatchewan Roughriders of Canadian Football League (CFL). Heenan played college football for the University of Saskatchewan, and was ranked as the second best player in the CFL's Amateur Scouting Bureau final rankings for players eligible in the 2012 CFL Draft, and first by players in Canadian Interuniversity Sport, at the end of the 2011 CIS season.

Professional career

Saskatchewan Roughriders
Heenan was selected first overall in the 2012 CFL Draft by the Saskatchewan Roughriders of Canadian Football League. Heenan spent three years as a member of the Roughriders, including in 2013 when he won his first Grey Cup championship as a member of the 101st Grey Cup-winning team. As a pending free agent, he was released on February 2, 2015, so that he could pursue National Football League opportunities.

Indianapolis Colts
On February 3, 2015, Heenan signed a 3-year, $1.575 million contract with the Indianapolis Colts. He joined Henoc Muamba as the second player signed by the Colts to have been selected first overall in the CFL Draft. Heenan was released in August after tearing his meniscus. On November 3, the Colts signed Heenan to their practice squad. Heenan announced his retirement from football on April 7, 2016.

References

External links
Saskatchewan Roughriders bio

1990 births
Living people
Players of Canadian football from Saskatchewan
Canadian football offensive linemen
Indianapolis Colts players
Saskatchewan Huskies football players
Sportspeople from Regina, Saskatchewan